Smout may refer to:
Smot (chanting), Buddhist chanting in Cambodia
Simple Magnetic Overunity Toy, claiming perpetual motion
SMOT – Business School, Chennai, India
Free Interprofessional Association of Workers (SMOT), Russia, subjected to political abuse of psychiatry in the Soviet Union

See also 
Smout, a surname